Webb Ellis Limited is a British manufacturing company based in London. The company, focused on rugby union and netball, manufactures a wide range of sports equipment, including sportswear, rugby union balls, protective gear, and accessories.

In the last years, Webb Ellis expanded its direction entering to the market of school uniforms.

History 

The company was founded in January 2003 by Rod and Lawrence Webb, as a manufacturer of products for the practise of rugby union that included team uniforms, boots and balls.

The first important contract for Webb Ellis came the same year of its foundation, when the company signed a deal with European Professional Club Rugby to supply official balls for the European Champions Cup (then "Heineken Cup"). Three years later, the Welsh Rugby Union chose the Webb Ellis balls for its national team home internationals. During the following years, Webb Ellis expanded its business area adding distributors in Ireland, France, USA, Canada, Argentina, Uruguay, Italy, Spain, South Africa, Japan, Australia and New Zealand.

Sponsorships 
Clubs and associations that have/had deals with Webb Ellis include:

Current 

  Banco Hipotecario
  Los Cedros
  Centro Naval 
  Círculo Universitario
  Marista
  San Carlos
  Sociedad Hebraica
  SITAS
  Los Tilos
  Sociedad Hebraica
  Wallingford RFC

Former

Clubs

  CASA de Padua 
  Los Cedros 
  DAOM
  Delta
  La Salle
  Lanús RC
  Liceo Militar 
  Liceo RC (Mendoza) 
  Lomas Athletic
  Los Tilos
  Mariano Moreno
  San Lorenzo
  Tigre RC
  Bogotá Athletic Club
  South Leicester
  Brooklyn
  New York
  Michigan RU

Unions 
  Buenos Aires RU - referees kits 
  Córdoba RU
  Rosario RU
  Tucumán RU
  Welsh Rugby Union - ball supplier

References

External links 
 
 Webb Ellis Schools

Sportswear brands
Manufacturing companies based in London
Clothing companies based in London
Clothing companies established in 2003
Sporting goods manufacturers of the United Kingdom
Shoe companies of the United Kingdom
2003 establishments in England